"Sorrow" is a song by the English progressive rock band Pink Floyd. Written by the band's singer and guitarist David Gilmour, it’s the closing track on their thirteenth studio album, A Momentary Lapse of Reason, released in 1987.

Lyrics and music
The piece was written and composed by singer and guitarist David Gilmour. He has stated that although words are not his strong point, the song is one of his best lyrical efforts, even as the opening lines were appropriated from John Steinbeck's The Grapes of Wrath.

Drummer Nick Mason has since stated that the song was almost entirely written by Gilmour over the space of a weekend on his houseboat Astoria. When Mason returned from the weekend, only "some spit and polish", according to Mason, was needed. Gilmour has also mentioned that his solo at the end of "Sorrow" was done on the boat, his guitar going through a small Gallien-Krueger amplifier.  As on many tracks from the album, Gilmour played a Steinberger GL "headless" guitar on this song. The guitar intro was recorded inside Los Angeles Memorial Sports Arena and piped through Pink Floyd's large sound system, yielding an extremely deep, cavernous sound. The drum machine on the song was programmed by David Gilmour — no real drums were used.

Live Versions
Live versions of the song are featured on 1988's Delicate Sound of Thunder album and 1995's Pulse album, with running times of 9:27 and 10:49 respectively, mostly taken up by extended guitar solos by Gilmour and an additional outro. A slightly shortened version of the song appears on Pink Floyd's greatest hits collection, Echoes: The Best of Pink Floyd, which is edited so that the song "Sheep" (also edited) segues into "Sorrow". David Gilmour played the song at the Strat Pack guitar concert, an event which commemorated the 50th anniversary of the Fender Stratocaster.  Gilmour played the song on the second set of his Rattle That Lock Tour 2015/16.. The song was also performed in 1990 during the band's set at Knebworth for the Silver Clef Award Winners Concert. For many years, an official release of this performance was unavailable, but the 2019 boxset The Later Years included it as part of the complete set list on both Blu-Ray/DVD and CD.

Personnel on studio version
Pink Floyd
David Gilmour – lead and backing vocals, electric guitar, keyboards, drum machine, programming

Additional musicians:

Richard Wright – Kurzweil synthesiser
Bob Ezrin – keyboards
Tony Levin – bass guitar
Darlene Koldenhoven – backing vocals
Carmen Twillie – backing vocals
Phyllis St. James – backing vocals
Donny Gerrard – backing vocals

Personnel on live versions

Delicate Sound of Thunder and Pulse
Pink Floyd
David Gilmour – lead vocals, lead guitar
Nick Mason – drums
Richard Wright – keyboards, backing vocals 
Additional musicians
Guy Pratt – bass guitar
Jon Carin – keyboards, backing vocals, programming
Tim Renwick – rhythm guitar
Gary Wallis – percussion, drums
Durga McBroom – backing vocals (Delicate Sound of Thunder and Pulse)
Rachel Fury – backing vocals (Delicate Sound of Thunder)
Margaret Taylor – backing vocals (Delicate Sound of Thunder)
Roberta Freeman - backing vocals (Delicate Sound of Thunder live)
Sam Brown – backing vocals (Pulse)
Claudia Fontaine – backing vocals (Pulse)

Live at Pompeii

 David Gilmour – lead vocals, lead guitar
 Steve DiStanislao – drums
 Chester Kamen – guitar, backing vocals
 Guy Pratt – bass, backing vocals
 Greg Phillinganes – keyboards, backing vocals
 Chuck Leavell – keyboards, backing vocals
 Brian Chambers – backing vocals
 Lucita Jules – backing vocals
 Louise Clare Marshall – backing vocals

References

Pink Floyd songs
1987 songs
Rock ballads
Songs written by David Gilmour
Song recordings produced by Bob Ezrin
Song recordings produced by David Gilmour